Leuciscus gaderanus is a species of ray-finned fish in the genus Leuciscus which is endemic to Iran.

References

Leuciscus
Fish described in 1899
Taxa named by Albert Günther